Arctia parthenos, the St. Lawrence tiger moth, is a moth in the family Erebidae. It was described by Thaddeus William Harris in 1850. It is found in boreal North America, ranging from Alaska to Labrador, south to New Mexico and Arizona in the Rocky Mountains and to North Carolina in the Appalachian Mountains. The habitat consists of riparian areas and mixed hardwood-conifer forests at middle to high elevations.

The length of the forewings is 28–33 mm. The forewings are chocolate brown, marked with cream-coloured spots. The hindwings are orange with black markings. Adults are on wing from late May until early August in one generation per year.

The larvae feed on various plants, including Salix, Alnus and Betula species. The species first overwinters as a fifth-instar larva and again as an eighth instar larva.

This species was formerly a member of the genus Platarctia, but was moved to Arctia along with the other species of the genera Acerbia, Pararctia, Parasemia, Platarctia, and Platyprepia.

References

Moths described in 1850
Arctiina